Retiro is a metro station which serves the Retiro District and Buen Retiro Park in Madrid, Spain.

References 

Line 2 (Madrid Metro) stations
Railway stations in Spain opened in 1924